Nippoptilia rutteni is a species of moth in the genus Nippoptilia, known from New Guinea. The specific name "rutteni" refers to microlepidopterist Dr. A.L.M. Rutten.

References

Platyptiliini
Moths described in 2003